Acacia subsessilis is a shrub of the genus Acacia and the subgenus Plurinerves that is endemic to an area of western Australia.

Description
Like most species of Acacia it has phyllodes rather than true leaves. It blooms from July to August and produces yellow flowers.

Taxonomy
It is closely related to Acacia diallaga both of which have phyllodes that change colour from green to a pale reddish hue during drought, it also is superficially similar to Acacia colletioides and Acacia chapmanii.

Distribution
It is native to an area in the Mid West and Wheatbelt regions of Western Australia where it is commonly situated on rocky hills growing in stony gravel or sandy soils over or around ironstone. It has a disjunct distribution over a limited range from around Mount Farmer Station in the west to Yalgoo in the east where it is usually a part of open shrubland communities.

See also
 List of Acacia species

References

subsessilis
Acacias of Western Australia
Taxa named by Bruce Maslin
Plants described in 1999